"Ev'ry Night" is a 2005 single by the Polish singer and dancer Mandaryna.

Background
"Ev'ry Night" was the first single released from Mandaryna's second album, Mandarynkowy sen. It's an uptempo dance track written and produced by Herald Reitinger and Uli Fisher. The song became Mandaryna's biggest hit. The accompanying music video was filmed in Croatia.

Mandaryna performed the song live at Sopot Festival where she came in second and caused a major media controversy after exposing her alleged lack of vocal talent.

Track listing
CD Single
 "Ev'ry Night" – 3:08

CD Maxi-Single
 "Ev'ry Night"
 "I Wanna Fly"
 "Stay Forever"
 "Twoje przeznaczenie"
 "You Are My Music"

References

2005 singles
Mandaryna songs
2005 songs
Universal Music Group singles